The  was an electric multiple unit (EMU) train type operated by Japanese National Railways (JNR) from 1958 until 1983.

Interior

History
They were renumbered into the JNR three-digit classification system from 1 June 1959.

From 1972, 153 series sets were introduced on Special Rapid services in the Kyoto-Osaka-Kobe area to compete against private railway operators. These were replaced by 117 series EMUs by the end of 1980.

The last sets remained in service on Tokaido Main Line Hiei and Tokai services until March 1983.

See also
 155 series

References

Japanese National Railways
Electric multiple units of Japan
Train-related introductions in 1958
1500 V DC multiple units of Japan
Kawasaki multiple units
Kisha Seizo multiple units
Kinki Sharyo multiple units
Nippon Sharyo multiple units